Jasper Chan (born 7 November 1988 in Singapore) is a Singaporean footballer who plays as a goalkeeper for S.League club, Geylang International.

Club career
Chan started out in football as a striker, only switching to between the sticks when he was 12 "because the competition for outfield players got a bit hot."

His rise from S-League rookie to major player has been a steep one. When he first joined his current club, Young Lions, he was only the 2nd choice keeper. But two months into his professional football career, he got a starting spot in the first eleven and he has kept it since.

In 2015, he signed for Hougang United.

International career
Chan was part of the Singapore Under-23 team that took part in the 2007 Southeast Asian Games in Korat, Thailand that won a bronze medal.

Chan sterling performances for the club has not gone unnoticed. He was first called up to the Singapore national football team in September 2007 and he has been a regular fixture in the national team since, although only as a substitute behind Lionel Lewis and Hassan Sunny. As of May 28, 2008, he was still uncapped.

The goalkeeping coach for Singapore, Lee Bee Seng who played for Singapore in the 1970s, made the bold prediction that "it is only a matter of time before (Chan) starts challenging for a place in the national team".

Personal life
Chan studied general business studies at Temasek Polytechnic.

Honours

International
Southeast Asian Games Bronze Medallist: 2007

References

External links

 

http://www.sleague.com/Web/Main.aspx?ID=,887925d1-1861-49fe-945d-b5b80365ea9e&NLT=300&AID=e626c46e-38b1-4810-bca5-2294f73c700c

1988 births
Living people
Singaporean footballers
Singaporean sportspeople of Chinese descent
Association football goalkeepers
Singapore Premier League players
Young Lions FC players
Southeast Asian Games bronze medalists for Singapore
Southeast Asian Games medalists in football
Competitors at the 2007 Southeast Asian Games